Sainte-Foy is a commune in the Seine-Maritime department in the Normandy region in northern France.

Geography

Population

Places of interest
 The church of St. Foy, dating from the eleventh century.
 An eleventh-century chapel.
 The château and its park.

See also
Communes of the Seine-Maritime department

References

Communes of Seine-Maritime